Major General  Sir Henry Tombs VC KCB (10 November 1824 – 2 August 1874) was a recipient of the Victoria Cross, the highest and most prestigious award for gallantry in the face of the enemy that can be awarded to British and Commonwealth forces.

Early life
Henry Tombs was born at sea on passage to India on 10 November 1824. He was the youngest of seven to Major-General John Tombs, Bengal cavalry, and Mary Remington. He was sent back to England for an education during which time he studied at John Roysse's Free School in Abingdon-on-Thames (now Abingdon School). At the age of 15 he entered the East India Company's Military Seminary at Addiscombe, graduating in June 1841 and receiving a commission in the Bengal Horse Artillery. In 1869 he married Georgina Janet Stirling, the youngest daughter of Admiral Sir James Stirling. Their grandson Joseph Tombs received the VC for actions during World War I.

Military career
Tombs received his commission as second lieutenant in the Bengal Horse Artillery on 11 June 1841, and first saw active service aged 19 during the Gwalior campaign. He distinguished himself while fighting at the December 1843 battle of Punniar with the No.16 Light Field Battery (horsedrawn), and was mentioned in dispatches and awarded the Punniar Star.

During the First Anglo-Sikh War (1845–1846) Tombs commanded a horse artillery troop at the battles of Moodkee and Ferozeshah, and was Aide-de-Camp to Lieutenant-General Sir Harry Smith at the battle of Aliwal. He was awarded a Sutlej Medal with two clasps (for Ferozeshuhur and Aliwal) in 1848.

During the Second Anglo-Sikh War (1848–1849), he served as Deputy Assistant Quartermaster General of Artillery. He was present at the battles of Ramnagar, Chillianwallah and Goojerat. He received the Punjab Medal with two clasps (for Chillianwallah and Goojerat) and was mentioned in dispatches. In 1854 he was promoted brevet Major for his services in the field.

Tombs saw service for a fourth time during the Indian Rebellion of 1857–1858, during which he commanded a troop of Horse Artillery. On 31 May 1857 his horse was shot from beneath him for the first time. He fought at the Battle of Badli-ki-Serai, where two horses were shot from under him. He was also present at the Siege of Delhi, during which he commanded the Bengal Horse Artillery contingent. It was during this siege, on 9 July 1857 that he performed the act of gallantry for which he was to be awarded the Victoria Cross. As a result of his and his troops' gallantry the unit was awarded the title of Tombs's Troop, which – as 28/143 Battery (Tombs's Troop), part of 19th Regiment Royal Artillery – it still carries to this day.

Victoria Cross
At the age of thirty-one, when a major in the Bengal Horse Artillery, Bengal Army during the Indian Mutiny, the following deed took place at the Siege of Delhi for which he and James Hills were awarded the VC:

Later career
For services at the siege of Delhi, Tombs was promoted brevet lieutenant-colonel and made a Companion of the Order of the Bath in January 1858. In March 1858 he took part in the siege and capture of Lucknow before participating in a number of minor operations. He was promoted brevet colonel in July 1858, and lieutenant-colonel, Royal Artillery, in April 1861. 

In 1864, as a brigadier-general, he served in the Bhutan War, commanding the force which recaptured Dewangiri Fort. Promoted major-general in March 1867 and made a Knight Commander of the Order of the Bath in March 1868, Tombs was appointed to command a division in 1871, first at Allahabad, then at Oudh. In 1874 he resigned his command due to ill health and died at Newport, Isle of Wight, on 2 August 1874, aged 49.

Assessment
Field-Marshall Roberts, a subaltern in during the Indian Rebellion, later wrote:The hero of the day [when he won the VC] was Harry Tombs … an unusually handsome man and a thorough soldier. … I had always heard of Tombs as one of the best officers in the regiment. …. As a cool, bold leader of men Tombs was unsurpassed: no fire, however hot, and no crisis, however unexpected, could take him by surprise; he grasped the situation in a moment, and issued his orders without hesitation, inspiring all ranks with confidence in his power and capacity. He was somewhat of a martinet, and was more feared than liked by his men until they realized what a grand leader he was, when they gave him their entire confidence, and were ready to follow him anywhere and everywhere.

At news of Tombs's death, the Commander-in-Chief, India, Lord Napier issued a general order expressing regret at the loss of "so distinguished an officer".

The medal
His Victoria Cross is displayed at the Royal Artillery Museum, Woolwich, London.

References

Sources
Monuments to Courage (David Harvey, 1999)
The Register of the Victoria Cross (This England, 1997)
Scotland's Forgotten Valour (Graham Ross, 1995)
Tombs of Abingdon (Nigel Hammond, Oxfordshire Family Historian, December 2004)
"Memoir of Major-General Sir Henry Tombs" (Royal Artillery Institution, 1913)
"Memoir of Major-General Sir Henry Marion Duran" (Volume 1, 1883)
"The New Army List; The Bank, Standing, and Various Services Regimental Officer in the Army Serving on Full Pay, Including the Royal Marines and Indian Staff Corps" (1869)
"The memoirs of the Gemini Generals: personal anecdotes, sporting adventures, and sketches of distinguished officers" (A. D. Innes, 1896)
"Dictionary of National Biography" (1885–1900, Volume 57)

External links
Details of Tombs grave. Friends of Newport & Carisbrooke Cemeteries
Location of grave and VC medal www.victoriacross.org.uk
East India Company Births
s:Tombs, Henry (DNB00) Dictionary of National Biography' (1885–1900, Volume 57)
Sir Henry Tombs: biography. VConline.org.uk

1824 births
1874 deaths
People educated at Abingdon School
Graduates of Addiscombe Military Seminary
British recipients of the Victoria Cross
Knights Commander of the Order of the Bath
Indian Rebellion of 1857 recipients of the Victoria Cross
British military personnel of the Bhutan War
British military personnel of the First Anglo-Sikh War
British military personnel of the Second Anglo-Sikh War
Graduates of the Royal Military College, Sandhurst
Military personnel from Kolkata
British Army generals
Royal Artillery officers
Bengal Artillery officers
Tombs family
People born at sea